Johnathan Haggerty (born February 5, 1988) is an American football wide receiver who is currently a free agent. He was previously a member of the Cleveland Browns and Chicago Bears. He played college football at SW Oklahoma State. After his time at the NFL, he then trained people of all ages at D1, a training facility in Dallas, Texas.

Professional career

Cleveland Browns
On April 30, 2010, Haggerty was signed as an undrafted free agent by the Cleveland Browns. He was then later waived by Cleveland on August 16, due to an injury suffered during week 1 of the preseason against Green Bay.

Haggerty was waived by Cleveland again on August 28, 2011.

Chicago Bears
Haggerty was signed to the Bears practice squad on December 20, 2011.

New England Patriots
On August 1, 2013, Haggerty was signed by the New England Patriots. He was released by the Patriots on August 30, 2013.

Wichita Falls Nighthawks
In 2015, Haggerty signed with the Wichita Falls Nighthawks of the Indoor Football League.

Texas Revolution
In March 2015, Haggerty joined the Texas Revolution of Champions Indoor Football.

Jacksonville Sharks
On April 7, 2015, Haggerty was assigned to the Jacksonville Sharks of the Arena Football League (AFL). On April 22, 2016, Haggerty was placed on reassignment by the Sharks.

Hudson Valley Fort
In the Fall of 2015, Haggerty signed with the Hudson Valley Fort of the Fall Experimental Football League (FXFL).

Sioux Falls Storm
On November 15, 2016, Haggerty signed with the Sioux Falls Storm. On February 9, 2017, Haggerty was released.

Texas Revoloution
On February 20, 2017, Haggerty signed with the Texas Revoloution. He was released on March 16, 2017. Haggerty re-signed with the Revolution on March 24, 2017. He was released again on March 27, 2017.

References

1988 births
Living people
People from Dallas
Players of American football from Texas
American football wide receivers
Southwestern Oklahoma State Bulldogs football players
Cleveland Browns players
New England Patriots players
Wichita Falls Nighthawks players
Texas Revolution players
Jacksonville Sharks players
Hudson Valley Fort players
Sioux Falls Storm players